WYVS 96.5 FM is a radio station licensed to Speculator, New York.  The station broadcasts an adult contemporary format and is owned by Tesiero, Joseph C.

References

External links
WYVS's official website

YVS
Mainstream adult contemporary radio stations in the United States